None More Black is a New Jersey-based punk rock outfit on Fat Wreck Chords, formed by lead singer/guitarist Jason Shevchuk after the demise of his previous band, Philadelphia's Kid Dynamite.   Jason left Kid Dynamite so that he could finish film school, and "to sort some things out." While at school, Jason had written some songs and would play them with his roommate Dan Gross and a Drum Machine. By 2000, they had a second guitarist and a real drummer. That lineup soon fell apart, but by 2001 Jason and Dan had recruited Jason's brother Jeff, along with a new drummer. After recording a 7" for Sub Division Records, that lineup fell apart, this time leaving only Jeff and Jason. In 2002 (after a few more lineup changes) a solid lineup was established, featuring Paul from Kill Your Idols on bass.  A demo was recorded, circulated, and the band went on to release their first full length on Fat Wreck Chords.

Their name originates from a line in mockumentary movie This Is Spin̈al Tap. Several of the band's song titles are references to jokes from the television show Seinfeld.

In January 2007 the band announced that they were going on a "hiatus" and that they would play shows every now and again. On May 19, 2008, the band announced on their MySpace page that they will be playing a free "reunion" show at the Deep Sleep photo gallery in Philadelphia, Pennsylvania, on July 4, 2008. Jason Shevchuk was working on a project called LaGrecia, which has since split. Colin McGinniss and Paul Delaney's outfit Ram & Ox has also called it quits. Jared Shavelson now plays drums in the hardcore band Paint It Black. Paul Delaney also currently fronts black metal/thrash act Black Anvil.

On July 7, 2008 the band announced on their Myspace blog that they have decided to re-form and will be recording a new album.

The band has released three full-lengths and two EPs. Their most recent album, titled "Icons", was released on October 26, 2010 by Fat Wreck Chords.

Band members
Jason Shevchuk
Paul Delaney
Richard Minino
Colin McGinniss

Former Band Members
Nick Rotundo- drums
Mike McEvoy – drums
David Wagenschutz – drums
Emmett Menke – drums
Jared Shavelson-drums
Dan Gross-bass
Nick Remondelli-bass

Timeline

Discography

Full Length Albums
File Under Black (Fat, 2003) – LP
This Is Satire (Fat, 2006) – LP
Icons (Fat, 2010) – LP

Demos
None More Black (Demo) – 2002

Singles and EPs
Seven Inch (Sub-Division, 2001) – 7"
Loud About Loathing (Sabot, 2004) – EP

Compilations
In Honor: A Compilation To Beat Cancer (Vagrant, 2004) – "They Got Milkshakes"
Rock Against Bush, Vol. 1 (Fat, 2004) – "Nothing To Do When You're Locked In A Vacancy"
Prisoners Of War: A Benefit For Peter Young (The Saturday Team, 2007) – "Burning Up The Headphones"
Wrecktrospective (Fat, 2009) – "Slytherin? My Ass!" (demo of "Under My Feet")
Will Yip:Off The Board (2013) – That Thing That Separates Em

Music Videos
 "Dinner's for Suckers" (2003)
 "Under My Feet" (2006)

References 

Musical groups established in 2000
Fat Wreck Chords artists
Punk rock groups from New Jersey
Melodic hardcore groups
Hardcore punk groups from New Jersey